Maxim Soloviev (born 20 February 1979) is a Russian former professional ice hockey defenceman. He last played with HC Dynamo Moscow in the Kontinental Hockey League (KHL).

After completing his eighth season with Dynamo following the 2017–18 campaign, Soloviev announced his retirement from his 21-year professional career on September 7, 2018. He later accepted an assistant coaching role into the following season with HC Spartak Moscow on October 19, 2018.

References

External links

1979 births
Living people
Russian ice hockey defencemen
HC CSKA Moscow players
HC Dynamo Moscow players
Krylya Sovetov Moscow players
Metallurg Novokuznetsk players
HC MVD players
HC Vityaz players
Ice hockey people from Moscow